Shadow on the Wall may refer to:

 Shadow on the Wall (song), a 1983 song by Mike Oldfield
 The Shadow on the Wall (1925 film), a 1925 film
 Shadow on the Wall (1950 film), a 1950 film
 Shadow on the Wall (Wednesday Theatre), a 1967 tele-play
 Shadows on the Wall, an album by Gordon Haskell